The 2009 IPP Trophy was a professional tennis tournament played on outdoor red clay courts. It was the twenty-second edition of the tournament which was part of the 2009 ATP Challenger Tour. It took place in Geneva, Switzerland between 17 and 23 August 2009.

Singles entrants

Seeds

 Rankings are as of August 10, 2009.

Other entrants
The following players received wildcards into the singles main draw:
  Evgeny Donskoy
  Antony Dupuis
  Sandro Ehrat
  Alexander Sadecky

The following players received entry from the qualifying draw:
  Gregoire Burquier
  Tim Goransson
  Andrei Gorban
  Dmitri Sitak

Champions

Singles

 Dominik Meffert def.  Benjamin Balleret, 6–3, 6–1

Doubles

 Diego Álvarez /  Juan-Martín Aranguren def.  Henri Laaksonen /  Philipp Oswald, 6–4, 4–6, [10–2]

External links
Official website
Drizia-Miremont Tennis Club
ITF Search 
2009 Draws

IPP Trophy
Geneva Open Challenger